Sound Shattering Sound is the major label debut by Perth alternative rock band Gyroscope released on 14 June 2004 in Australia and debuted a week later on the Australian album charts in the top 40 at No 37.

History 

The album was produced by Shaun O'Callaghan (John Butler Trio, Eskimo Joe) who had  produced the band's previous two EPs. Gyroscope vocalist and guitarist Daniel Sanders says on the Festival Mushroom Records website. "The music that drove us the most were albums like Weezer's debut, or Foo Fighters The Colour and the Shape. They were more of an adventure rather than just being a 40-minute album. I think we got there in the end."

Five out of the album's twelve tracks were previously available either on the band's earlier EPs or singles.

Singles 

The first single from the album, "Safe Forever", was released on 15 March 2004, peaking in the top 100 of the ARIA Singles Chart. The song also polled at No. 97 on Triple J's Hottest 100 for 2004.

The second and third singles, "Take This for Granted" and "Get Down" both failed to chart. The music videos for both "Safe Forever" and "Take This for Granted" were directed by Matt Weston. The video for "Take This For Granted" was shot in Sydney at the now closed White Bay Power Station (the same location used in The Matrix Reloaded, Mission: Impossible III and Red Planet films).

Track listing

References

External links
 

2004 debut albums
Gyroscope (band) albums